Gnecchi-Soldo Organtino (1530 – April 22, 1609) was an Italian missionary with the Society of Jesus, of Nanban period (1543–1650). He is an example of Nanbanjin (Barbarians from the south, as the Occidental were called), who visited Japan at that period.

With a motive to promote Christianity in East Asia Organtino joined Society of Jesus, and he was sent to Japan in 1570 via Portuguese India and Portuguese Malacca. Earning a respect of Oda Nobunaga, Organtino built Nanban temple in Kyoto in 1576, monastery and church in Azuchi by Lake Biwa in 1580. He also opened religious school. In sum, he made a great contribution to missionary work in Japan.

After sent to Nagasaki, he died there on April 22, 1609.

External links
Soldo Organtino:The Architect of the Japanese Mission

Organtino
1530 births
1609 deaths
16th-century Italian Jesuits
17th-century Italian Jesuits
Italian Roman Catholic missionaries
Jesuit missionaries in Japan
Missionary educators
Italian expatriates in Japan